Mukkha Fall is situated on the Robertsganj to Ghorawal road, approximately  to the west of Robertsganj and  from Ghorawal, in the Sonbhadra district of Uttar Pradesh on the Belan River. It is a water fall in Uttar Pradesh.

Attractions
The water body lies close to a Devi Mandir and Karia Tal or the lake on the Belan River. It is one of the most magnificent waterfalls in the district. It presents a breathtaking sight during the rainy season. There are rock paintings called Lakhaniya Cave Paintings near Mukkha Fall in the cave which were drawn by Early Man.

References

Waterfalls of Uttar Pradesh
Tourist attractions in Sonbhadra district